Jean Gagnon may refer to:
 Jean Gagnon (bishop) (1941–2016), Canadian Roman Catholic bishop
 Jean Gagnon (curler) (born 1970), Canadian curler
 Jean Gagnon (ice hockey) (born 1956), Canadian ice hockey player
 Johnny Gagnon (Jean Joseph "Black Cat" Gagnon, 1905–1984), Canadian ice hockey player